Live Seattle, WA 12/13/03 is a two-disc live album by the American rock band The Rockfords. It was released on December 28, 2003 through Kufala Recordings.

Overview
The Rockfords features members of Goodness and Pearl Jam. The album was recorded on December 13, 2003 at the Crocodile Cafe in Seattle, Washington. The songs performed at the concert come from the band's debut album, The Rockfords, as well as the EP Waiting..., which was released in early 2004. The album was released through Kufala Recordings in 2003.

Track listing

Disc one
"Adelaide" (Chris Friel, Rick Friel, Mike McCready, Danny Newcomb) – 5:00
"This Life" (Carrie Akre, Friel, Friel, McCready, Newcomb) – 4:04
"Waiting" (Akre, Friel, Friel, McCready, Newcomb) – 4:28
"Flashes" (Akre, Friel, Friel, McCready, Newcomb) – 3:35
"Do It" – 6:50
"Everything" (Akre, Friel, Friel, McCready, Newcomb) – 4:38
"Spiral" (Friel, Friel, McCready, Newcomb) – 4:55
"So Young" (Akre, Friel, Friel, McCready, Newcomb) – 7:15

Disc two
"Call My Name" (Akre, Friel, Friel, McCready, Newcomb) – 5:00
"Coat of Arms" (Akre, Friel, Friel, McCready, Newcomb) – 5:37
"Silver Lining" (Friel, Friel, McCready, Newcomb) – 6:59
"Something True" (Akre, Friel, Friel, McCready, Newcomb) – 5:01
"Sureshot" (Akre, Friel, Friel, McCready, Newcomb) – 5:19
"Distress" (Friel, Friel, McCready, Newcomb) – 3:50
"Island" (Friel, Friel, McCready, Newcomb) – 4:12
"Windows" (Akre, Friel, Friel, McCready, Newcomb) – 7:36

Personnel
The Rockfords
Carrie Akre – vocals
Chris Friel – drums
Rick Friel – bass guitar
Mike McCready – guitar
Danny Newcomb – guitar

Production
Hank Fleming, Bootsy Holler – photos
Ben Kersten – recording, mixing

References 

The Rockfords albums
2003 live albums